The Fair Play AVA is an American Viticultural Area in El Dorado County, California, United States. It is entirely contained within the boundaries of the El Dorado AVA and the Sierra Foothills AVA. The most popular wine grape variety is Zinfandel, although varieties native to southern France and Italy are gaining in popularity.

Wineries 
As of January 2019, American Winery Guide lists 32 wineries as being within the Fair Play AVA:

 Bechard Vineyard & Winery
 Bumgarner
 Busby Vineyard & Winery
 C.G. DiArie Vineyard and Winery
 Cantiga Wineworks
 Cedar Creek Ranch & Vineyards
 Cedarville Vineyard
 Charles B. Mitchell Vineyards
 Château d’ Estienne
 Element 79 Vineyards
 Fleur De Lys Winery
 Gold Mountain Winery & Lodge
 Golden Leaves Vineyard & Winery
 Gwinllan Estate
 Iverson Winery
 Mastroserio Winery
 Mediterranean Vineyards
 Mellowood Vineyards
 MV Winery - Miller Vineyards
 Oakstone Winery
 Perry Creek Winery
Sentivo Vineyards & Winery
 Shadow Ranch Vineyard
 Skinner Vineyards & Winery
 Toogood Estate Winery
 Van der Vijver Estate
 Vista del Mirador Winery
 Windwalker Vineyards
 Winery by the Creek

References 

American Viticultural Areas
American Viticultural Areas of California
Geography of El Dorado County, California
2001 establishments in California